Kasthuri TV is a 24-hour General Entertainment channel broadcasting in Kannada-language. Based in Bengaluru, Karnataka, India, the channel is a part of Kasthuri Medias Pvt. Ltd.

History
Kasthuri TV is a 24-hour Kannada Language Entertainment Television Channel was launched On 26 September 2007. This is the first Channel by a Kannidaga. Mrs.Anitha Kumaraswamy wife of former Karnataka Chief Minister H. D. Kumaraswamy is managing director of Kasthuri Medias Pvt. Ltd, initially airing 60 percent news and 40 percent entertainment programs.

Kasthuri TV is the only TV channel owned by a Kannadiga. All other Kannada TV channels are owned by other language people.

Taking pride that Kasthuri TV will be the first Kannada channel to have been started by a Kannadiga, Mr.H.D.Kumaraswamy said the idea was conceived by him in 1995, when he was producing films.

Mrs.Anitha Kumarswamy has promised to launch two more 24-hour TV channels, devoted to music and news.

"The channel will maintain its independence while telecasting news and views of political developments," says Mrs.Anitha Kumaraswamy,whose business interests include film production and distribution.

"In that way, we will not function like many other channels of other languages, which are controlled by politicians," she averts. Being Mr. H.D.Kumaraswamy's wife does not make her compromise on the values she has believed in. "My channel will be primarily a pro-Kannada Channel. This is the first Kannada TV channel owned by a Kannadiga. This is our major USP. All other Kannada channels are owned by people from other states. I have engaged the best people in my endeavour to give the best entertainment and news value to viewers," she says.

Channels

Current Shows
Baa Guru Tindi Tinnona
Directors Special

Former Shows

Serials 

Rajkumari
Sreeni Loves Paadu 
Nagamandala
Mamateya Kareyole
Etu Ediretu
Annayya
Parinaya
Jai Anjaneya
Charulatha
Chakravyuha
Mangala Gowri
Chandramukhi
Asadhya Aliyandru
Mouna Mathadaga
Mannina Runa
Anju Mallige
Panjarada Gili
Kasturi
Nagamani
Sai Baba
Suppanathi Subbi
Nee Nadeva Haadiyalli
Aa Ooru E Ooru
Mumbelaku

Cookery Shows 

Banuvarada Baadoota
Kasthuri Kitchen
NalaPaka

Reality Shows 

Miss Mahalakshmi
Prerana
Jabardast
Chinnada Bete Season 2
Henmakle Strongu Guru
Jackpot Season 2
Kabbadi
Naane Rajkumari
Chinnada Bete Season 2
Comedy Ustad
Kala Belaku Stars Of Karnataka
Just Sangeetha
Comedy Darbar
Citizen
Kamanabillu
Rani Maharani Season 3
Halli Duniya
Saptaswara Season 3
Rock N Roll
Rani Maharani Season 2
Seere Beka Seere
Superstar
Comedy Stars
Jackpot
Hrudayageethe Baredeninu
Saptaswara Season 2
Rani Maharani
Dream Girl
Super Samsara
Idu Yaaru Bareda Katheyo
D For Danger
Geethanjali
Jana Jana Kanchana
Adurstha Lakshmi
Preethiyinda Ramesh
Talk Of The Town
Haasyada Rasa
Dum
Saptaswara

Dubbed Shows 

 Suryaputra Karna
Hrudaya Geethe
Aruna Raga
Aa Rathri
Crime Patrol

See also
List of Kannada-language television channels
Television in India
Media in Karnataka
Media of India

References

Kannada-language television channels
Television stations in Bangalore
24-hour television news channels in India
2007 establishments in Karnataka
Television channels and stations established in 2007